The 1921 Gonzaga Bulldogs football team was an American football team that represented Gonzaga University during the 1921 college football season. In their second year under head coach Gus Dorais, the Bulldogs compiled a 2–4–1 record and were outscored by a total of 93 to 64.

Schedule

References

Gonzaga
Gonzaga Bulldogs football seasons
Gonzaga Bulldogs football